In architecture, the lantern tower is a tall construction above the junction of the four arms of a cruciform (cross-shaped) church, with openings through which light from outside can shine down to the crossing (so it also called a crossing lantern).

Many lantern towers are usually octagonal, and give an extra dimension to the decorated interior of the dome.

An affiliated term is the Italian , which is the lantern atop a dome. 
The word  is from the Medieval Latin  (a variant of ).

See also 
 Roof lantern

Gallery

References

External links
 

Towers
Church architecture